Eugen Jakobčič (23 March 1898 – 30 June 1980) was a Yugoslav fencer. He competed in the team sabre event at the 1936 Summer Olympics.

References

External links
 

1898 births
1980 deaths
Yugoslav male sabre fencers
Olympic fencers of Yugoslavia
Fencers at the 1936 Summer Olympics